Igor Savić (born 8 October 2000) is a Bosnian footballer who plays as a midfielder for Russian club Torpedo Moscow.

Career 
He made his Premier League of Bosnia and Herzegovina debut for Zrinjski Mostar on 7 April 2019 in a game against FK Krupa.

On 8 September 2022, Savić signed with Torpedo Moscow in the Russian Premier League.

Career statistics

References

External links 
 

2000 births
Sportspeople from Mostar
Living people
Bosnia and Herzegovina footballers
Bosnia and Herzegovina youth international footballers
Bosnia and Herzegovina under-21 international footballers
Association football midfielders
HŠK Zrinjski Mostar players
NK GOŠK Gabela players
FC Torpedo Moscow players
Premier League of Bosnia and Herzegovina players
First League of the Federation of Bosnia and Herzegovina players
Russian Premier League players
Bosnia and Herzegovina expatriate footballers
Expatriate footballers in Russia
Bosnia and Herzegovina expatriate sportspeople in Russia